Precision Air Services Plc (operating as Precision Air; DSE:PAL) is a Tanzanian airline based at Julius Nyerere International Airport in Dar es Salaam. The airline operates scheduled passenger services to Nairobi, Entebbe, and to various airports and airstrips throughout Tanzania.

History
Precision Air was incorporated in Tanzania in January 1991 as a private airline and started operations in 1993. At first, it operated as a private charter air transport company but in November 1993 changed to offer scheduled services to serve the growing tourist market.

In 2006, Precision Air became the first Tanzanian airline to pass the IATA Operational Safety Audit.

In April 2011, the airline became a public company.

Corporate affairs

Ownership
Precision Air was privately owned until 2003, when Kenya Airways acquired a 49 percent stake, paying US$2 million, weeks after its rival South African Airways acquired a 49 percent stake in Air Tanzania for US$20 million. The remaining 51 percent was retained by Michael Shirima, the founder of the airline.

In October 2011, Precision Air floated shares in its stock in an initial public offering on the Dar es Salaam Stock Exchange, after which Shirima's and Kenya Airways's stakes declined and the new share subscribers owned 15.86 percent. As of 31 March 2016, the major shareholders were:

Business trends
Because it was a private company until 2011, published figures were not generally available before the initial public offering prospectus of 12 September 2011. Since then, full Annual Reports and Accounts have been published. (however, those for 2019 and 2020 are still awaited.)

Available trends over recent years for the Precision Air group (Precision Air Services Plc and its subsidiaries Precision Handling Limited and Precise Systems Limited) (as at year ending 31 March) are:

Published reports in June 2013 indicated that Precision Air had encountered substantial financial difficulties, stemming in part from losses incurred while operating flights to and from Johannesburg, South Africa. Those flights ended in September 2012. The Citizen, a Tanzanian newspaper, reported in August 2013 that the airline "desperately" needed a US$32 million bailout package from the Tanzanian government or other non-shareholder sources. The airline's problems increased in 2011 when it received only US$7.4 million of the US$17.5 million in cash that the airline hoped to receive when first listed on the Dar es Salaam Stock Exchange. Increasing fuel prices, taxes, and levies plus currency fluctuations and the refusal of minority owner Kenya Airways to contribute capital had also hurt the airline.

Destinations

As of May 2019, the airline served the following 14 locations:

Partnerships

Codeshare agreements

Precision Air has codeshare agreements with the following four airlines:

 Etihad Airways (Abu Dhabi-Dar es Salaam)
 Kenya Airways (various routes)
 LAM Mozambique Airlines (Maputo–Nampula–Pemba–Dar es Salaam)
 RwandAir (Kigali–Kilimanjaro)

Interline agreements

In 2011, Precision Air entered into an interline agreement with Qatar Airways, allowing the latter's passengers to connect to other east African destinations such as Arusha and Zanzibar via Dar es Salaam and Kilimanjaro International Airport. This agreement includes e-ticketing.

As of 23 December 2014, Precision Air also had 21 interline agreements for baggage and paper ticketing purposes with the following airlines:

 Air Seychelles (also e-ticketing)
 Alitalia 
 British Airways (also e-ticketing) 
 Egyptair 
 Emirates
 Ethiopian Airlines (also e-ticketing) 
 Etihad Airways 
 Gulf Air 
 Hahn Air (also e-ticketing) 
 Heli Air Monaco 
 Kenya Airways (also e-ticketing) 
 KLM (also e-ticketing)
 LAM Mozambique Airlines (also e-ticketing)
 Oman Air
 RwandAir
 Saudia
 SN Brussels Airlines
 South African Airways (also e-ticketing)
 Swiss International Air Lines
 TAAG Angola Airlines (also e-ticketing)
 Virgin Atlantic (also e-ticketing)

Fleet

Current fleet

As of November 2022, the Precision Air fleet included the following aircraft:

Historical fleet
The airline has previously operated the following aircraft:

 ATR 42-320
 Boeing 737–300
 Bombardier Dash 8

Accidents and incidents

According to the Aviation Safety Network Precision Air has had seven accidents or incidents. One of those caused 19 fatalities.

 26 July 1999: A Let L-410UVP-E9, tail number 5H-PAB, made a belly landing at Arusha Airport on a training flight while doing a touch and go landing. The two crew and three passengers were not injured.
 16 November 2004: A Let L-410UVP-E20, tail number 5H-PAC, crash landed while on a training flight at Kilimanjaro Airport. The two pilots, who had not put on their shoulder straps, sustained facial injuries.
 8 July 2007: An ATR 72–212, tail number 5H-PAR, had a runway excursion on landing at Nairobi's Jomo Kenyatta International Airport runway 06. It veered to the right, went over a ditch, and came to a stop on Taxiway F. The nose wheel collapsed. The four crew and 62 passengers were not injured. The aircraft was substantially damaged. The probable cause of this accident was power asymmetry during application of reverse thrust on landing. The control levers were jammed in one position.
 On 13 December 2013, an ATR 42–600 (5H–PWI) made a safe landing at Arusha Airport after its four tires deflated upon landing. All 37 passengers and 4 crew were safe. The airline subsequently explained that higher braking forces, necessitated by the aircraft landing with a tailwind, caused the deflations.
 10 July 2014: An ATR 72–500, tail number 5H-PWA, was halfway to Dar es Salaam from Mwanza during normal cruise when the number 2 engine seized. This necessitated a diversion to Kilimanjaro International Airport. The aircraft touched down normally; however, after selecting ground idle (as per the captain's explanation), the aircraft veered to the left and exited the runway hitting one of the runway edge lights and proceeded to roll on the grass field parallel to runway 09 for approximately 180 meters before subsequently regaining the runway. No injuries were reported.
 9 December 2018 Flight PW 722 with 68 passengers from Nairobi to Mwanza via Kilimanjaro had multiple birdstrikes on approach, including on the wheels that caused difficulties on landing.
 6 November 2022: Precision Air Flight 494, an ATR 42-500 (5H-PWF) with 39 passengers and 4 crew crashed in Lake Victoria while landing at Bukoba Airport, Tanzania. There were 19 deaths. It was the first fatal accident in the airline's history.

References

External links

Airlines of Tanzania
Airlines established in 1991
1991 establishments in Tanzania
Tanzanian brands